Paracobitis boutanensis is a species of stone loach native to Helmand basin in Afghanistan.

References

Banarescu, P.M. and T.T. Nalbant, 1995. A generic classification of Nemacheilinae with description of two new genera (Teleostei: Cypriniformes: Cobitidae). Trav. Mus. Hist. Nat. 35:429-496.

boutanensis
Fish of Asia
Fish of Afghanistan
Taxa named by John McClelland (doctor)
Fish described in 1842